Senator Carrell may refer to:

Mike Carrell (1944–2013), Washington State Senate
Tom C. Carrell (1900–1972), California State Senate

See also
Senator Carroll (disambiguation)